The 1953 Rutgers Queensmen football team represented Rutgers University in the 1953 college football season. In their 12th season under head coach Harvey Harman, the Queensmen compiled a 2–6 record, won the Middle Three Conference championship and were outscored by their opponents 215 to 126.

Schedule

References

Rutgers
Rutgers Scarlet Knights football seasons
Rutgers Queensmen football